Gove may refer to:

People
 Michael Gove, a British cabinet minister

Places
 Gove, Bhiwandi, Gove is a village in the Thane district of Maharashtra, India. It is located in the Bhiwandi taluka.
 Gove (Baião), a civil parish in the municipality of Baião, Portugal-see List of parishes of Portugal: B

Australia
 Gove Peninsula, Northern Territory, Australia
 Gove Airport in Gove Peninsula

United States
 Gove County, Kansas
 Gove City, Kansas
 Gove Township, Gove County, Kansas

Other uses
 Gove (name)
 Gove Australian Football League